AVN Media Network is a publishing, digital media and event management company for the adult entertainment industry. AVN Media Network's portfolio of businesses includes several widely recognized adult industry publications, expos, shows, and communities. These include gfy.com, an adult webmaster community, AVN magazine, AVN Online, GAYVN and AVN Adult Entertainment Expo.

AVN Media Network, Inc. is headquartered in the Chatsworth, CA

See also
 AVN Adult Entertainment Expo
 Pornography in the United States

References

External links
Official Website

Adult entertainment companies
Event management companies of the United States